The following are the national records in athletics in Jamaica maintained by its national athletics federation: Jamaica Athletics Administrative Association (JAAA).

Outdoor
Key to tables:

+ = en route to a longer distance

A = affected by altitude

h = hand timing

OT = oversized track (> 200m in circumference)

Men

Women

Mixed

Indoor

Men

Women

Notes

References
General
Jamaican Outdoor Records 6 August 2021 updated
World Athletics Statistic Handbook 2022: National Indoor Records
Specific

External links
JAAA web site

Jamaica
Records
Athletics
Athletics